Sadali is a hobli  (group of villages) headquarters in Chikballapur district, Karnataka, India. It is located at a distance of about 100 km from Bangalore. It is equidistant from five taluk headquarters: Sidlaghatta, Chintamani, Bagepalli, Gudibanda and Chikballapur.

Sadali has mythological, historical and semi-historical folklore links.

Geography
Sadali in Sidlagatta Taluk, is a village north of Sidlagatta town on the road to Bagepalli. It is surrounded by small hillocks. It has two big tanks built by the kings of erstwhile Kingdom of Mysore.

Mythology
Tradition has it that it was founded by Sahadeva, the youngest of the Pandava brothers, and hence was called Sahadevapatna/Sahadevapura. It was later abbreviated as  Sahadevapalli, Sadahalli and now Sadali.

History
It was one of the provinces under Vijayanagara Empire  called the Sadali Kingdom, which seems to have included Chikkaballapur and the adjoining area; this was in Naganna Odeyar's charge under Bukka in 1371 AD.  Naganna Odeyar and his son Depanna Odeyar  figure prominently in connection with Sadali between 1370 and 1385. Their exact relation with the ruling family of Vijayanagara is not known.

In the historical period, the village changed hands several times. Khasim Khan, a Military Commandant of Moghul Empire conquered this area and it was annexed to the Sira Suba (Province of Sira) and bestowed as a Jagir on two Muslim chiefs. (One of them was Fateh Mohamad, father of Hyder Ali). To prevent its falling into the hands of Nawab of Cuddapah, they privately disposed of it about 1759 AD to Dodda Baire Gauda of Chikballapur and later it was seized by Hyder Ali, father of Tippu Sultan in 1762 AD. Dodda Baire Gauda was a descendant of Rana Baire Gauda who ruled Avathi. This dynasty was responsible for development of Chikballapur, Doddaballapur, Sidlagatta and Sadali.

Folklore
There was a Palegar by name Thirumalayya. A hillock is identified even today by his name called Thirumalayyana Gudda. He had one hundred wives. He was very strict in his administration and maintenance of law and order.

There was a poor old woman with two sons. She had lost her husband in young age and brought up her sons with great difficulty. They were simple minded and used to work as labourers in the fields. It was very difficult to lead the life with their meagre income. These two young men went near the tank in the early hours of an unlucky day and found some Jowar (maize) crop yield leftovers on a rock by the side of the hillock. They brought it home without expecting any harm. The yield had been stolen by some thieves the previous night from the field of a farmer of the village.

Meanwhile the farmer complained the matter to the Palegar who promptly ordered an enquiry. The servants of the Palegar found the leftovers of the yield in front of the house of the old woman who supposedly did not own a piece of land. The sons of the old woman were immediately arrested. The poor old woman pleaded innocence of her sons with the Palegar, explaining the facts. But the witnesses were against them and they were executed.

Soon after the cremation of the bodies of her sons, the old woman cursed the village be destroyed with the rain of fire within a day and ended her life jumping into the tank. She also cursed the farmers:Jowar crop sown by any farmer be destroyed without a trace and the farmer be subjected to the fury of the village deity, Sadalamma.
Sadalamma Temple.

Accordingly the original Sadali was supposed to have been destroyed by the rain of fire and the present town had been built to the east of the old town after this event. Until recently the farmers of the town were afraid of sowing Jowar in their fields.

Present condition
Chennakeshava temple, [known as Peddagudi (= Big Temple)] in a dilapidated and neglected condition, is still standing as an eye witness to this gory incident. The architecture of this beautiful temple resembles the style of the temples at Hampi, the capital of Vijayanagara Empire. The temple might have been constructed during the rule of Naganna Odeyar or Depanna Odeyar. The idol of Lord Chennakeshava is said to have been removed from peddagudi and re-installed in the present town. There are no records  available as to when and why exactly these events happened, but ashes of a potters' lane can still be found at the foot of the north side of Thirumalayyana Gudda.

https://www.youtube.com/watch?v=iaohWcPKib4
There is sadalamma temple which was modified by the villagers and public.

References

Cities and towns in Chikkaballapur district